Kreshchenskoye is a rural locality (a village) in Staroarzamatovsky Selsoviet, Mishkinsky District, Bashkortostan, Russia. The population was 29 as of 2010. There is 1 street.

Geography 
Kreshchenskoye is located 19 km northeast of Mishkino (the district's administrative centre) by road. Ozerki is the nearest rural locality.

References 

Rural localities in Mishkinsky District